Alois (Latinized Aloysius) is an Old Occitan form of the name Louis. Modern variants include Aloïs (French),  Aloys (German), Alois (Czech), Alojz (Slovak, Slovenian), Alojzy (Polish), Aloísio (Portuguese, Spanish, Italian), and Alajos (Hungarian).

People called Alois/Aloys 
 Alois Alzheimer (1864–1915), German psychiatrist and neuropathologist
 Alois Arnegger (1879–1963), Austrian painter
 Alois Biach (1849–1918), Austrian physician and medical writer
 Alois Brunner (1912–2001), Austrian Nazi SS concentration camp war criminal
 Alois Carigiet (1902–1985), Swiss illustrator
 Alois Dryák (1872–1932), Czech architect
 Alois Eliáš (1890–1942), Czech general and politician
 Alois Estermann, senior officer of the Pontifical Swiss Guard who was murdered in his apartment
 Alois Hába, Czech composer
 Alois Hitler (1837–1903), born Aloys Schicklgruber; Adolf Hitler's father
 Alois Hitler, Jr. (1882–1956), Adolf Hitler's half-brother
 Alois Hudal (1885–1963), Rome-based, pro-Nazi bishop of Austrian descent
 Aloys I, Prince of Liechtenstein
 Aloys II, Prince of Liechtenstein
 Alois Jirásek (1851–1930), Czech writer
 Alois Kayser (1877–1944), German Roman Catholic missionary who spent almost 40 years on Nauru and wrote a Nauruan grammar
 Alois Kříž (1911–1947), Czechoslovak journalist and Nazi collaborator who was executed
 Alois Leiter (1965-), American former left-handed starting pitcher in Major League Baseball
 Aloïs Michielsen (born 1942), Belgian businessman
 Alois Mock (1934–2017), Austrian politician
 Alois Musil (1868–1944), Czech explorer, orientalist and writer
 Alois Negrelli (1799–1858), Tyrolean engineer and railroad pioneer in Austria, Italy and Switzerland
 Aloys Pennarini (1870–1927), tenor opera singer, opera director and film actor
 Aloys P. Kaufmann (1902–1984), mayor of Saint Louis
 Alois P. Swoboda (1873–1938), pioneer of American physical culture
 Alois Rašín (1867–1923), Czech economist and politician
 Alois Riehl (1844–1924), Austrian philosopher
 Alois Senefelder (1771–1834), Austrian actor and playwright who invented the printing technique of lithography
 Alois Vašátko (1908–1942), Czech fighter pilot
 Alois von Reding (1765–1818), Swiss patriot
 Alois, Hereditary Prince of Liechtenstein (born 1968)
 Alois Švehlík (born 1939), Czech actor
 Alois Trancy, fictional character in the Japanese anime Black Butler
 Aloïs Catteau (1877–1939), Belgian cyclist
 Aloys Sprenger (1813–1893), Austrian historian
 Aloys Wach (1892–1940), Austrian expressionist painter and graphic artist
 Arnold Alois Schwarzenegger, Austrian actor and American politician
 Brother Alois (born 1954), Prior of the Taizé community
 Pope Benedict XVI (born 1927), born Joseph Alois Ratzinger

Other uses
Aloys (film), a 2016 Swiss film

Masculine given names
German masculine given names
Czech masculine given names